The Bailey-Moyes Tempest,  is an Australian-American high-wing, strut-braced, single-seat, microlift glider that was designed by Bob Bailey of Florida, United States and produced by Moyes Microlights of Waverley, New South Wales, Australia.

Design and development
The Tempest is a development of the Advanced Aeromarine Sierra and was designed to be towed aloft behind an ultralight aircraft.

The aircraft's  span wing is made from aluminium tubing covered in Dacron and is supported by a single lift strut on each side, plus a jury strut. The fuselage is made from fiberglass and features a canopy that is hinged on one side for cockpit access. The landing gear is either a monowheel gear or, optionally, bicycle gear.

When it was available the aircraft was supplied as a kit, that required an estimated 200 hours to complete, or as a complete ready-to-fly aircraft. In 1998 the kit was US$10,000 and the complete aircraft was US$12,500. Twelve were reported as flying by the end of 2001.

Aircraft on display
Massey Air Museum, Massey, Maryland, United States

Specifications (Tempest)

See also

References

External links
Photo of the Tempest in the Massey Air Museum

1990s Australian sailplanes
Homebuilt aircraft
Moyes Microlights aircraft